Van Hise Rock is a rock monolith located along Wisconsin Highway 136 near Rock Springs, Wisconsin. The rock is a geologically significant outcropping of Baraboo Quartzite.

It serves as a monument to Charles Van Hise, a prominent Wisconsin geologist who studied the area extensively. The rock was declared a National Historic Landmark in 1997.

Description

Van Hise Rock is made of Baraboo quartzite, a type of pink-purple quartzite found in south central Wisconsin. It is one of the best-exposed parts of the Baraboo Range, a ring of quartzite hills that passes through Columbia and Sauk Counties. The quartzite in the range was formed as sandstone during the Precambrian Supereon; then a greenschist phase changed it to quartzite.

The monolith is located in a wayside on Wisconsin Highway 136, about 3/4 mile north of the intersection with Wisconsin Highway 154 near the village of Rock Springs. The wayside provides visitor access to the rock.

History
The rock is named in honor of Charles Van Hise, a prominent geologist who chaired the University of Wisconsin Department of Mineralogy and Geology. Among his significant accomplishments in geology and politics, Van Hise determined how the quartzite in the Baraboo Range had formed. Building on earlier discoveries that the quartzite formed in the Precambrian Era and had metamorphosed, Van Hise was able to determine the forces that deformed the rock; his discoveries helped form the key principles of structural geology. Van Hise also used his studies of the quartzite's conversion from sandstone to write the Treatise on Metamorphism in 1904, the first publication to describe the process of metamorphism in detail. University of Wisconsin geologists used Van Hise Rock to demonstrate the properties and principles which Van Hise discovered; the rock is still used in geological education and research.

See also
List of National Historic Landmarks in Wisconsin
National Register of Historic Places listings in Sauk County, Wisconsin

References

Further reading
 Dott, Robert H. Jr. "Van Hise Rock in the Baraboo Hills". Wisconsin Academy Review, vol. 45, no. 3 (Summer 1999): 35–36.

External links

 Van Hise Rock at National Historic Landmarks Program
 Van Hise Rock and its geologic context
 The Van Hise Rock in context
 Van Hise Monolith Gains National Historic Status

Landforms of Sauk County, Wisconsin
Quartzite formations
Rock formations of Wisconsin
National Historic Landmarks in Wisconsin
National Register of Historic Places in Sauk County, Wisconsin
Natural features on the National Register of Historic Places in Wisconsin
Precambrian United States